Chu So-jung (born November 6, 1995), better known by her stage name Exy, is a South Korean rapper, singer and songwriter. She debuted as a member and leader of South Korean-Chinese girl group WJSN under Starship and Yuehua Entertainment in 2016.

Personal life
Exy was born on November 6, 1995, in Geumjeong District, Busan, South Korea. She has 2 siblings; 1 older sister and 1 younger brother.

She enrolled in Dongduk Women's University along with member Soobin. In August 2020, she graduated from Dongduk Women's University.

Career

Pre-debut
Exy was previously trained under Medialine Entertainment along with member Seola, and was part of the group Viva Girls. However, Medialine went bankrupt and both Exy and Seola left the company.

2015: Career beginnings, Unpretty Rapstar 2

Exy participated in the reality survival rap program, Unpretty Rapstar 2 in 2015. Exy collaborated with Crucial Star on the single "쓸어버려", released on September 1, 2015. She then released her first solo single "Gettin' Em" on November 10, 2015. Exy was cast in the television series The Flatterer, playing as Saerim in the series.

2016: Debut with WJSN, Y-Teen

Exy was revealed to be a member of WJSN and its "Sweet Unit" on December 24, 2015. WJSN debuted on February 25, 2016, with the release of their debut EP Would You Like?, including the lead singles "Mo Mo Mo" and "Catch Me".

On June 26, 2016, Exy participated in King of Masked Singer as a contestant. After being eliminated in the first round, she revealed that she originally trained as a vocalist. However, due to suffering from vocal nodules during her trainee period, she switched over to rap.

In August 2016, Exy, together with Seola, Soobin, Eunseo, Cheng Xiao, Yeoreum, and Dayoung teamed up with label mate Monsta X to form the unit "Y-Teen". Y-teen was a project unit group that promoted as CF models for KT’s phone fare service and would release EPs, music videos, and various entertainment content.

2017–present: Solo activities
In April 2017, it was announced that Exy would be collaborating with rapper Euna Kim on the single "Love Therapy". The single was released on May 4, 2017, accompanied with a music video.

In February 2018, Exy made her songwriting debut with "겨울잠 (Thawing)", in the WJSN EP, Dream Your Dream. On March 25, 2018, She revealed her 2nd songwriting work during WJSN's 1st fanmeeting Uzzu Party, titled "2월의 봄 (You & I)". It was eventually included in the WJSN EP, WJ Please? She was featured in Sobae's "Homegirl", released on March 27, 2018, and Choi Nakta's "Love Professor", released on December 23, 2018. In November 2019, Exy co-composed and co-wrote "Don't Touch", which was included in the WJSN EP, As You Wish.

On March 19, 2020, She participated in the OST for the drama Meow, the Secret Boy along with member Dayoung.In June 2020, Exy co-composed and co-wrote "불꽃놀이 (Tra-la)", which was included in the WJSN EP, Neverland.

In January 2021, She wrote lyrics for label mate Cravity's title track "My Turn" and "Bad Habits" from their 3rd EP, Season 3. Hideout: Be Our Voice. In mid-March 2021, Exy co-wrote the lyrics for The Boyz's "Prism" from their 1st Japanese studio album, Breaking Dawn. She was credited as 'XYZ(makeumine works)' on most platforms but 'Exy' on Melon. In late-March 2021, Exy co-composed and co-wrote "음 (Yalla)", which was included in the WJSN EP, Unnatural. On April 26, it was announced that Exy would be a member of WJSN's 2nd sub-unit WJSN The Black. The sub-unit debuted on May 12. Later in September 2021, Exy was confirmed to join the JTBC drama Idol: The Coup, which would air in the second half of 2021.

Discography

Soundtrack appearance

Filmography

Film

Television series

Television shows

Web shows

Radio shows

Songwriting credits
All song credits are adapted from the Korea Music Copyright Association's database, unless otherwise noted.

References

External links

 

1995 births
Living people
People from Busan
South Korean female idols
South Korean women pop singers
Starship Entertainment artists
21st-century South Korean singers
South Korean dance musicians
Cosmic Girls members
Unpretty Rapstar contestants
21st-century South Korean women singers
21st-century women rappers
South Korean hip hop record producers
Dongduk Women's University alumni